Şaban, the Turkish is a popular cinema character, portrayed by Turkish actor Kemal Sunal. Both figures rose to fame hand in hand, as the commoner clean-hearted looks of Şaban on the screen became very popular among Turkish citizens, and the two names had been used interchangeably, similar to the connection between The Tramp and Charlie Chaplin. The character sometimes appeared as "İnek Şaban" (Şaban the Geek), most significantly in the popular film series Hababam Sınıfı.

Even if Sunal went on to play darker and more realistic characters in his later projects, Şaban became a trademark figure in the national filming history. One of the most popular films which features Şaban is Tosun Paşa. He is very popular among the Turkish people.

Filmography

External links
Kemal Sunal Films page
Kema Sunal Movies on the net
Kemal Sunal films on blog
Kem Sunal Fan Blog Page
Kem Sunal Movies

Fictional Turkish people